Kenshichi Yokoyama (born 22 September 1916) was a Japanese basketball player. He competed in the men's tournament at the 1936 Summer Olympics.

References

External links
 

1916 births
Possibly living people
Japanese men's basketball players
Olympic basketball players of Japan
Basketball players at the 1936 Summer Olympics
Place of birth missing